Anson Chan Ngai-san (born 22 November 2000), better known by his stage name ANSONBEAN, is a Hong Kong singer and actor. He won third place in ViuTV's reality talent competition King Maker III in 2020. He made his solo debut on 26 July 2021 with the single "Crush (oh no!)". He earned a nomination for the Best Original Film Song in Warriors of Future at 41st Hong Kong Film Awards in 2023.

Discography

Singles 
 "Crush (oh no!)" (2021)
 "You Made My Day" (2021)
 "Rise" (2022)
 "OMG (on my grind)" (2022)
 "LOVE/PAIN" (2022)
 "Ain't No Smarties" (2023)

Collaboration Songs
 "@princejoyce" (Feat. ANSONBEAN) with Joyce Cheng (2021)
 "You made my day" with Lai Ying (2021)
 "明日之明日" (Warriors of Future Theme Song) with Winka Chan (2022)
 "作動小愛戀" (  Theme Song) with Kayan9896 and Lam Chin Ting (2022)
 "Canned Soup" (Soup Version) with Chase Chan (2022)
 "OMG" (Grind Version) feat Chase Chan (2022)

Filmography

Films

Dramas

Television Shows

Videography

Music videos

Awards and nominations
Music Award

Film Award

References

External links

Ansonbean's Official Youtube

2000 births
Living people
King Maker III contestants
Cantopop singers
Hong Kong male singers
21st-century Hong Kong male singers
Hong Kong male film actors
Hong Kong television personalities
Hong Kong male television actors
Hong Kong idols
Alumni of the Hong Kong University of Science and Technology
Media Asia Music Artists